The 2017 AFC Champions League qualifying play-offs were played from 24 January to 8 February 2017. A total of 23 teams competed in the qualifying play-offs to decide eight of the 32 places in the group stage of the 2017 AFC Champions League.

Teams
The following 23 teams, split into two regions (West Region and East Region), entered the qualifying play-offs, consisting of three rounds:
2 teams entered in the preliminary round 1.
11 teams entered in the preliminary round 2.
10 teams entered in the play-off round.

Format

In the qualifying play-offs, each tie was played as a single match. Extra time and penalty shoot-out were used to decide the winner if necessary (Regulations Article 9.2). The eight winners of the play-off round advanced to the group stage to join the 24 direct entrants. All losers in each round from associations with only play-off slots entered the AFC Cup group stage.

Schedule
The schedule of each round was as follows.

Bracket

The bracket of the qualifying play-offs for each region was determined by the AFC based on the association ranking of each team, with the team from the higher-ranked association hosting the match. Teams from the same association could not be placed into the same play-off.

Play-off West 1
 Al-Wahda advanced to Group D.

Play-off West 2
 Al-Fateh advanced to Group B.

Play-off West 3
 Esteghlal advanced to Group A.

Play-off West 4
 Bunyodkor advanced to Group C.

Play-off East 1
 Ulsan Hyundai advanced to Group E.

Play-off East 2
 Gamba Osaka advanced to Group H.

Play-off East 3
 Shanghai SIPG advanced to Group F.

Play-off East 4
 Brisbane Roar advanced to Group E.

Preliminary round 1
A total of 2 teams played in the preliminary round 1.

|+East Region

|}

East Region

Preliminary round 2
A total of 12 teams played in the preliminary round 2: 11 teams which entered in this round, and 1 winner of the preliminary round 1.

|-
|+West Region

|-
|+East Region

|}

West Region

East Region

Play-off round
A total of 16 teams played in the play-off round: 10 teams which entered in this round, and 6 winners of the preliminary round 2.

|-
|+West Region

|+East Region

|}

West Region

East Region

Notes

References

External links
, the-AFC.com
AFC Champions League 2017, stats.the-AFC.com

1
January 2017 sports events in Asia
February 2017 sports events in Asia